Colin Liddell (10 June 1925 – 1997) was a Scottish footballer who played for Queen's Park, Greenock Morton, Heart of Midlothian, Rangers and Stirling Albion.

Liddell played for Morton in the 1948 Scottish Cup Final. He was transferred to Heart of Midlothian for £10,000 in 1949, then moved to Rangers in 1951 in a swap for Eddie Rutherford.

References

External links

1925 births
1997 deaths
Scottish footballers
Queen's Park F.C. players
Greenock Morton F.C. players
Heart of Midlothian F.C. players
Rangers F.C. players
Stirling Albion F.C. players
Association football wingers
People from Govan
Footballers from Glasgow
Scottish Football League players
Date of death missing
Place of death missing